The following lists events that have happened in 1797 in the Qajar dynasty, Iran.

Incumbents
Monarch: Mohammad Khan Qajar (until June 17), Fat′h-Ali Shah Qajar (starting June 17)

Events
 June 17 - Fath-Ali Shah Qajar ascended to the throne.

Death
 June 17 - Mohammad Khan Qajar, first king of Qajar Dynasty, was assassinated in Shusha, capital of Karabakh Khanate.

References

 
Iran
Years of the 18th century in Iran
1790s in Iran
Iran